Roy Herbert Thomson, 1st Baron Thomson of Fleet,  (5 June 1894 – 4 August 1976) was a Canadian-born British newspaper proprietor who became one of the moguls of Fleet Street in London.

He first came to prominence when he was selling radios in Ontario, and to give his customers more programmes to listen to, decided to launch his own radio station. He then moved into newspapers, becoming as wealthy and important in Canada as the press barons in the United Kingdom. He aspired to such a peerage but was denied it unless he moved residence to the UK. He invited British newspaper owners to sell to him, the first doing so being The Scotsman and he soon formed a commercial television company which gained the first ITV franchise in Scotland, the Scottish Television, today known as STV, which is also nowadays the last ITV franchise not to be owned by ITV plc. From the substantial profits of commercial television he bought many titles such as The Times and Kemsley's Newspapers which published The Sunday Times; both of these are nowadays owned by News UK, a division of News Corp.

Early life
Thomson was born on 5 June 1894 as Roy Herbert Thomson in Toronto, then part of York County, Ontario, Canada. His father was Herbert Thomson, a telegraphist turned barber who worked at Toronto's Grosvenor Hotel (at the corner of Yonge and Alexander streets – now the site of the Courtyard Marriott), and English-born Alice Maud. The family lived at 32 Monteith Street, off Church Street in Toronto. Thomson's paternal grandparents were Hugh Thomson and Mary Nichol Sylvester. Hugh was one of ten children of George Thomson, son of Archibald Thomson (born May 1749).

Thomson's ancestors were small tenant farmers on the estates of the Dukes of Buccleuch at Bo'ness, in the parish of Westerkirk, Dumfriesshire, Scotland. Archibald Thomson emigrated from Westerkirk to Canada (then British North America) in 1773, and married Elizabeth McKay of Quebec. The family eventually settled in Upper Canada, but retained a sentimental attachment to their country of origin. Archibald's brother David Thomson was the first European settler of Scarborough, Ontario.

Career
During World War I, Roy Thomson attended a business college, and owing to bad eyesight he was rejected by the army. He went to Manitoba after the war to become a farmer, but was unsuccessful. Thomson returned to Toronto, where he held several jobs at different times, one of which was selling radio receivers. However, he found selling radios difficult because the only district left for him to work in was Northern Ontario. In order to give his potential customers something to listen to, he undertook to establish a radio station. By quite a stroke of luck, he was able to procure a radio frequency and transmitter for $201. CFCH officially went on the air in North Bay, Ontario, on 3 March 1931. He sold radio receivers for quite some time after that, but his focus gradually shifted to the radio station.

Thomson purchased the Timmins Daily Press in Timmins, Ontario, his first newspaper, with a down payment of $200 in 1934 (an equivalent of $3,816 in 2021). He began an expansion of radio stations and newspapers in various Ontario locations in partnership with fellow Canadian Jack Kent Cooke. In addition to his media acquisitions, by 1949 Thomson was the owner of a diverse group of companies, including several ladies' hairstyling businesses, a fitted kitchen manufacturer, and an ice-cream cone manufacturing operation. By the early 1950s, he owned 19 newspapers and was president of the Canadian Daily Newspaper Publishers Association, and then began his first foray into the British newspaper business by starting up the Canadian Weekly Review to cater to expatriate Canadians living in Britain. He aspired to a peerage, similar to the press barons of the UK, and moved across the Atlantic, settling in Edinburgh.

In 1952, Thomson bought The Scotsman newspaper in Edinburgh from its impecunious owners. In 1957, Thomson launched a successful bid for the commercial television franchise for Central Scotland, named Scottish Television, basing it in the Theatre Royal, Glasgow. It became highly profitable, with Thomson describing it as a "permit to print money" (often misquoted as a "licence to print money"). In 1959, Thomson purchased the Kemsley group of newspapers, the largest in Britain, which included The Sunday Times. Over the years, Thomson expanded his media empire to include more than 200 newspapers in Canada, the United States, and the United Kingdom. His Thomson Organization became a multinational corporation, with interests in publishing, printing, television, and travel. In 1966, Thomson bought The Times newspaper from members of the Astor family.

In the 1970s, Thomson joined with J. Paul Getty in a consortium that successfully explored for oil in the North Sea.

A modest man, who had little time for pretentious displays of wealth, in Britain he got by virtually unnoticed, riding the London Underground to his office each day. Nonetheless, he made his son Kenneth promise to use the hereditary title that he had received in 1964, if only in the London offices of the firm.

Personal life 
On 29 July 1916, Thomson married Edna Annis Irvine (1895-1951) in Toronto, Ontario, Canada. Edna A. Irvine was the daughter of John Irvine and Rebecca Caldwell. 
Thomson had three children: Kenneth Roy Thomson (1923–2006), Irma Jacqueline Thomson (b. 20 October 1918) and Phyllis Audrey Thomson (b. 6 July 1917).

On 22 February 1951, Thomson's wife Edna died in Fort Lauderdale, Florida.

In 1952, Thomson moved to Edinburgh.

As of 1964 and 1965, Thomson owned a residence near Port Credit, on Mississauga Road.

In 1976, Thomson died in London, England. A plaque was placed in the crypt of St Paul's Cathedral.

After Thomson's death in 1976, his son Kenneth became chair of Thomson Corporation and inherited the baronial title becoming the 2nd Baron Thomson of Fleet. With the Thomson operations now principally again in Canada, the younger Thomson did not use his title in Canada though he did so in Britain, and used two sets of stationery reflecting this dichotomy. In any case, as the peerage title he had was inherited, it did not debar him from retaining his Canadian citizenship, and he never took up his right to a seat in the pre-1999 House of Lords.

Legacy 
Roy Thomson Hall, one of Toronto's main concert halls, is named in his honour as the Thomson family donated $5.4 million to its construction.
Thomson Student Centre at Memorial University of Newfoundland was named in his honour. It opened 25 May 1968, by the Right Honourable Lord Thomson of Fleet, chancellor of Memorial University of Newfoundland from 1961 to 1968.

Descendants 
Thomson's family continues to use the Baron of Fleet title. A select family tree is shown below:

Honours
In the 1964 New Year Honours, it was announced that Thomson would be elevated to the peerage as a Baron "for public services". On 10 March 1964 he was made Baron Thomson of Fleet, of Northbridge in the City of Edinburgh. In order to receive this title, it was necessary for Thomson to acquire British citizenship, as the Canadian government had made it common practice since 1919 to disallow the conference of titular honours from the sovereign on Canadians. However, the Canadian Citizenship Act between 1947 and 1977 stated that any Canadian who became a citizen of another country through means other than marriage would cease to be a Canadian citizen. Thus, Thomson lost his Canadian citizenship in the process.

He was appointed Knight Grand Cross of the Order of the British Empire (GBE) in the 1970 New Year Honours.

In 1972, he received the Golden Plate Award of the American Academy of Achievement.

Arms

See also
 Canadian peers and baronets
 Cash for Honours
 Thomson Corporation

References

Further reading
 Braddon, Russell. Roy Thomson of Fleet Street (London: Collins, 1965)
 Goldenberg, Susan. The Thomson Empire (Kampmann & Co, 1984)

External links
 The men who made The Scotsman: Part two
 Lord Thomson of Fleet
 Canadian Communications Foundation
 Never a Backward Step, a 1966 National Film Board of Canada documentary on Thompson (requires Adobe Flash)

 

1894 births
1976 deaths
Businesspeople in tourism
Canadian newspaper chain founders
Canadian mass media company founders
Canadian people of English descent
Canadian people of Scottish descent
Canadian university and college chancellors
Canadian peers
Canadian socialites
Progressive Conservative Party of Canada candidates for the Canadian House of Commons
Candidates in the 1953 Canadian federal election
Knights Grand Cross of the Order of the British Empire
People from Old Toronto
Roy
Gardiner family
Hereditary barons created by Elizabeth II